Dragan Kavaz (Serbian Cyrillic: Драган Каваз; born 4 December 1966) is a retired Bosnian footballer.

External links
 Dragan Kavaz at Chemnitzer FC official site

1966 births
Living people
Association football defenders
Yugoslav footballers
Bosnia and Herzegovina footballers
FK Kabel players
RFK Novi Sad 1921 players
FK Napredak Kruševac players
FC Rot-Weiß Erfurt players
SV Elversberg players
Chemnitzer FC players
Yugoslav Second League players
First League of Serbia and Montenegro players
Regionalliga players
Bosnia and Herzegovina expatriate footballers
Expatriate footballers in Germany
Bosnia and Herzegovina expatriate sportspeople in Germany